The 2020 Brabantse Pijl was the 60th edition of the Brabantse Pijl cycle race and was held on 7 October 2020. The race covered , starting in Leuven and finishing in Overijse. Originally, the race was to be held on 15 April 2020, but it was postponed due to the COVID-19 pandemic.

With around 11 kilometers to go, on the final ascent of the Moskesstraat, a decisive selection of three riders broke and managed to stay away to contest for the win. In doing so, Alaphilippe won his first race as world champion after a premature celebration and relegation at the 2020 Liège–Bastogne–Liège a few days prior cost him the win there. Benoît Cosnefroy of  finished third to complete the podium.

Teams
Fifteen UCI WorldTeams and ten UCI ProTeams made up the twenty-five teams that participated in the race. All but two teams entered seven riders;  entered six, while  entered five. 114 of the 172 riders in the race finished.

UCI WorldTeams

 
 
 
 
 
 
 
 
 
 
 
 
 
 
 

UCI Professional Continental teams

Result

References

2020
Brabantse Pijl
Brabantse Pijl
Brabantse Pijl
Brabantse Pijl